Structures I (1952) and Structures II (1961) are two related works for two pianos, composed by the French composer Pierre Boulez.

History
The first book of Structures was begun in early 1951, as Boulez was completing his orchestral work Polyphonie X, and finished in 1952. It consists of three movements, or "chapters", labelled Ia, Ib, and Ic, composed in the order a, c, b. The first of the second book's two "chapters" was composed in 1956, but chapter2 was not written until 1961. The second chapter includes three sets of variable elements, which are to be arranged to make a performing version. A partial premiere of book2 was performed by the composer and Yvonne Loriod at the Wigmore Hall, London, in March 1957. This was Boulez's first appearance in the UK as a performer. The same performers gave the premiere of the complete second book, with two different versions of chapter2, in a chamber-music concert of the Donaueschinger Musiktage on Saturday, 21 October 1961.

Structures I was the last and most successful of Boulez's works to use the technique of integral serialism, wherein many parameters of a piece's construction are governed by serial principles, rather than only pitch. Boulez devised scales of twelve dynamic levels (though in a later revision of the score these reduced to ten), twelve durations, and—from the outset—ten modes of attack, each to be used in a manner analogous to a twelve-tone row. The composer explains his purpose in this work:
I wanted to eradicate from my vocabulary absolutely every trace of the conventional, whether it concerned figures and phrases, or development and form; I then wanted gradually, element after element, to win back the various stages of the compositional process, in such a manner that a perfectly new synthesis might arise, a synthesis that would not be corrupted from the very outset by foreign bodies—stylistic reminiscences in particular.

Discography

Book 1
 Aloys and Alfons Kontarsky, 1960, Domaine musical
 Aloys and Alfons Kontarsky, 1965, Ariola Tonstudio, Cologne, WERGO
 Pi-Hsien Chen and Ian Pace, 2–5 October 2007, WDR Funkhaus, Klaus-von-Bismarck Saal, Hat-Hut
  and Nicolas Hodges, 2019, Pierre Boulez Saal, Berlin, bastille musique

Book 2
 Pierre Boulez and Yvonne Loriod, 20–21 October 1961, Hans-Rosbaud Studio, Baden.-Baden. 75 Jahre Donaueschinger Musiktage 1921–1996. 12-CD set, mono & stereo. Col Legno Contemporary WWE 12CD 31899. [Munich]: Col Legno Musikproduktion GmbH, 1996. CD 10, Col Legno Contemporary WWE 1CD 31909, includes the world-premiere performance of Structures pour deux pianos, deuxième livre, played by Yvonne Loriod and Pierre Boulez.
 Aloys and Alfons Kontarsky, 1965, Ariola Tonstudio, Cologne, WERGO
  and Pi-Hsin Chen, 30 March 1985, Weinbrenner-Saal des Kurhauses, Baden-Baden, Sony
 Florent Boffard and Pierre-Laurent Aimard, October 1994, ESPRO, IRCAM, Deutsche Grammophon
 Pi-Hsien Chen and Ian Pace, 2–5 October 2007, WDR Funkhaus, Klaus-von-Bismarck Saal, Hat-Hut
 Michael Wendeberg and Nicolas Hodges, 2019, Pierre Boulez Saal, Berlin, bastille musique

See also

 Time point

References 

Sources

Further reading

 Boulez, Pierre. 1986b. Orientations. London: Faber and Faber. .
 . 1981. "Deux aspects de l'univers boulezien: Structures pour deux pianos à quatre mains". Critique, no. 408:478–484.
 
 Febel, Reinhard. 1978. Musik für zwei Klaviere seit 1950 als Spiegel der Kompositionstechnik. Herrenberg: Musikverlag Döring. Second, revised and expanded edition, Saarbrücken: Pfau-Verlag, 1998. .
 Jameux, Dominique. 1989. Boulez: Le Marteau Sans Maître. Programme booklet. CBS Masterworks CD MK 42619.
 Jameux, Dominique. 1991. Pierre Boulez. Cambridge, Massachusetts: Harvard University Press. .
 Losada, Catherine C. 2014. "Complex Multiplication, Structure, and Process: Harmony and Form in Boulez's Structures II". Music Theory Spectrum 36, no. 1 (Spring): 86–120.
 Song, Sun-Ju. 2008. Music Analysis and the Avant-Garde Compositions of Post–World War II: Four Case Studies. 2 vols. Ph.D. diss. Nathan, Queensland: Queensland Conservatorium Griffith University.
 Wilkinson, Marc. 1958. "Some Thoughts on Twelve-Tone Method (Boulez: Structure Ia)",  no. 10:19–29.

External links
Work details, Book I, Book II, Universal Edition

Compositions by Pierre Boulez
1952 compositions
1961 compositions
20th-century classical music
Compositions for two pianos
Serial compositions